Dowreh County or Chegeni County is in Lorestan province, Iran. The capital of the county is the city of Sarab-e Dowreh. At the 2006 census, the county's population (as Dowreh-e Chegeni District and Veysian District of Khorramabad County) was 44,146 in 9,722 households. The following census in 2011 counted 43,221 people in 10,819 households, by which time those districts had been separated from the county to form Dowreh County. At the 2016 census, the county's population was 41,756 in 11,948 households.

Administrative divisions

The population history and structural changes of Dowreh County's administrative divisions over three consecutive censuses are shown in the following table. The latest census shows three districts, six rural districts, and two cities.

References

 

Counties of Lorestan Province